Kadhim Kamil  (born 1 July 1951) is a former Iraqi football forward  who played for Iraq in the 1974 Asian Games and 1976 AFC Asian Cup.

Hesham played for the national team from 1974 to 1976.

References

Iraqi footballers
Iraq international footballers
1976 AFC Asian Cup players
Living people
Association football defenders
1951 births